The women's rhythmic teams all-around gymnastics competition at the 2014 Commonwealth Games in Glasgow, Scotland was held on 24 July at the Scottish Exhibition and Conference Centre.

Final
The final results:

References

Gymnastics at the 2014 Commonwealth Games
2014 in women's gymnastics